The 1977 Women's College World Series (WCWS) was held in Omaha, Nebraska on May 25–29.  Sixteen college softball teams met in the AIAW fastpitch softball tournament.  This was the first WCWS in which regional tournaments were conducted for teams to qualify for the final tournament.

Teams
The double-elimination tournament included these teams:

 Arizona
 Arizona State
 CSU–Sacramento
 Kansas
 Michigan State
 Nebraska–Omaha

 Northern Colorado
 Northern Iowa
 Oklahoma State
 Oregon State
 Southern Illinois
 Southwest Missouri State
 Springfield College (Massachusetts)
 Texas–Arlington
 West Chester State (Pennsylvania)
 Western Illinois

After appearing in three previous WCWS in 1973, 1975, and 1976, Northern Iowa won its first national championship by defeating Arizona, 7-0, in the "if necessary" game behind pitcher Pat Stockman.

Bracket

Source:

Ranking

See also

Footnote

References

Women's College World Series
Soft
Women's College World Series
Women's College World Series
Women's College World Series
Women's sports in Nebraska